Pleurobema marshalli, the flat pigtoe or Marshall's mussel, was a species of freshwater mussel in the family Unionidae, the river mussels. It was native to Alabama and Mississippi, but it has not been seen since 1980. Though it is still listed as critically endangered on the IUCN Red List and as an endangered species on the US Endangered Species List, it is likely extinct.

This mussel was last seen in a stretch of the Tombigbee River before the habitat was destroyed by the installation of the Tennessee-Tombigbee Waterway. No living or freshly dead specimens have been seen since.

A Fish and Wildlife Service press release in September 2021 formally proposed the species be delisted from the endangered species list due to extinction.

References

Endemic fauna of Alabama
Endemic fauna of Mississippi
marshalli
Molluscs described in 1927
ESA endangered species
Taxonomy articles created by Polbot